94.1 GNN FM (DXKW 94.1 MHz) is an FM station owned and operated by Kalayaan Broadcasting System. Its studios and transmitter are located at Sorilla Medical and Maternity Clinic and Hospital, National Highway, Brgy. Sibsib, Tulunan.

References

External links
GNN FM FB Page

Radio stations in Cotabato
Radio stations established in 2009